Daedong Corporation, also known by the brand name Kioti in the U.S., is a South Korean agricultural machinery manufacturer founded in 1947 and headquartered in Daegu, South Korea. Its main products include tractors, combine harvesters, all-terrain utility vehicles and engines .

History
At first, Daedong's business was primarily in metal casting. Daedong began producing agricultural machinery in 1949. 

By 1985 they exported their first tractors, and Kioti USA was formed 1993. The company was formerly known as Daedong Industrial Co., Ltd. and changed its name to Daedong Corporation in March 2021.

Kioti Tractor
Kioti Tractor ( "coyote") is the trade name for Daedong tractors in U.S. and other markets.

Product range

Tractors
Farm implements
Attachments
Zero-turn Mowers
Rice transplanters
Combine harvesters
All-terrain vehicles
Skid-steer loaders
Engines

See also
List of tractor manufacturers

References

External links

Daedong Official Website

Tractor manufacturers of South Korea
Lawn and garden tractors
Garden tool manufacturers
Companies based in Daegu